The 1996 AFF Championship, sponsored by Asia Pacific Breweries and officially known as the 1996 Tiger Cup, was the inaugural edition of the AFF Championship. It was hosted by Singapore from 1 to 15 September 1996 with all 10 nations of Southeast Asia taking part, four of which were invitees.

Teams 
All six founding members of the ASEAN Football Federation are participants, with the former Indochina nations joining as invitees as they were not yet members of the AFF at this time.

Venues

Squads

Tournament

Group stage

Group A

Group B

Knockout stage

Semi-finals

Third place play-off

Final

Incidents 
Two Singaporeans and one Malaysian were arrested for attempting to fix a group stage game between Singapore and the Philippines. The three reportedly tried to bribe Filipino defender Judy Saluria for his side to concede seven goals so the Singapore can advance to the next round.

Awards

Goalscorers 
7 goals
  Netipong Srithong-in

6 goals
  K. Sanbagamaran

5 goals
  Kiatisuk Senamuang

4 goals

  Kurniawan Dwi Yulianto
  Peri Sandria
  Shamsurin Abdul Rahman
  Win Aung
  Fandi Ahmad
  Vo Hoang Buu

3 goals

  Fachri Husaini
  Eri Irianto
  M. Chandran
  Phithaya Santawong
  Worrawoot Srimaka
  Le Huynh Duc

2 goals

  Anuar Abu Bakar
  Maung Maung Htay
  Maung Maung Oo
  Myo Hlaing Win
  Tran Cong Minh
  Nguyen Hong Son

1 goal

  Irwan Mohammad
  Nuth Sony
  Robby Darwis
  Ansyari Lubis
  Aples Gideon Tecuari
  Saysana Savatdy
  Chalana Luang-Amath
  Keolakhone Channiphone
  Bounlap Khenkitisack
  Phonesavanh Phimmasean
  Azman Adnan
  Zainal Abidin Hassan
  Rosdee Sulong
  Tin Myo Aung
  Hasnim Haron
  Lim Tong Hai
  Steven Tan
  Nguyen Huu Dang
  Huynh Quoc Cuong

1 own goal
  Yeyen Tumena (playing against Vietnam)
  Azmil Azali (playing against Indonesia)

Team statistics 
This table will show the ranking of teams throughout the tournament.

Media Coverage 
  - Vintage Television and IBC-13
  - Singapore Television Twelve (STV12): Prime 12 and Premiere 12 (Host broadcaster & Media partner)
 Rest of ASEAN - No information available

Notes

References 
General

 "Tiger Cup 1996". AseanFootball.org. ASEAN Football Federation. Retrieved 3 March 2010.
 Courtney, Barrie. "ASEAN ("Tiger") Cup 1996". RSSSF. Retrieved 3 March 2010.

Specific

 
AFF Championship
AFF Championship
AFF Championship tournaments
1996